New Public Cemetery (Hungarian: Új köztemető or Rákoskeresztúri sírkert) is the largest cemetery in Budapest and one of the largest in Europe with an area of about 2.07 km2 and 3 million burials since its opening in 1886. It is adjacent to the Kozma Street Cemetery; the largest Jewish cemetery in Hungary. Its main building, which was constructed in 1903, has a 26-meter-high bell tower. In addition to its rich vegetation and wide avenues, the cemetery is famous for plot 301, where the martyrs of the 1956 revolution were buried. Today, an enormous modern monument by György Jovánovics marks their graves.

History and description
The New Cemetery opened on May 1, 1886. The first funeral took place on August 6, 1886, when Victoria Závoly; the widow of a laborer was buried. The cemetery was expanded five times and now covers around more than 2 km2. To date, approximately 3 million people have been interred at the New Public Cemetery of Budapest.

Plot 301
Imre Nagy, the Prime Minister of Hungary and 260 others executed by the Soviets in 1958, were buried in an unmarked grave in the New Public Cemetery. Nagy was disinterred and given a state funeral in 1989.

Notable interments
 Imre Nagy (1896-1958), Hungarian communist politician who was appointed Chairman of the Council of Ministers of the People's Republic of Hungary on two occasions
 Pál Maléter (1917-1958), Hungarian general executed along with Imre Nagy
 Gyula Aggházy (1850-1919), Hungarian painter and teacher
 Jenő Brandi (1913-1980), Hungarian water polo player who competed in the 1936 Summer Olympics and in the 1948 Summer Olympics
 Lajos Keresztes (1900-1978), Hungarian wrestler and Olympic champion in Greco-Roman wrestling
 István Kozma (1939-1970), Hungarian wrestler, Olympic champion and world champion in Greco-Roman wrestling
 Béla Goldoványi (1925-1972), Hungarian athlete
 Márton Bukovi (1903-1985), Hungarian association football player and manager
 Gábor Bódy (1946-1985), Hungarian film director, screenwriter, theoretic

Gallery

See also
 Kozma Street Cemetery

Source and references

Cemeteries in Budapest
1886 establishments in Austria-Hungary
Cemeteries established in the 1880s